Gazza's Superstar Soccer is a football game released for the Amstrad CPC, ZX Spectrum, Amiga 500/600, Atari ST and Commodore 64 platforms.  It was created in 1989 by Empire Interactive, and was named after the popular English footballer Paul Gascoigne. It was also released in the Netherlands and Germany as Bodo Illgner's Super Soccer and in Scandinavia as Anders Limpar's Proffs Fotboll

The game was included in several sports games compilations, such as Soccer Mania and Grandstand. The game also had a sequel, named Gazza II.

Gameplay 

The game has no scroll. Instead, it has three different screens showing one third of the field each. In one the player gets a side view of the middle of the field. When the ball goes out of the screen, a new screen with the goal at its top is shown (the camera is "flying" over the middle of the field).

A triangle is used to indicate the height and side effect of each shot.

References

External links
 Commodore 64 screenshots of the game at s64.emuunlim.com
 Amstrad version of the game review at cpcgamereviews.com
 Anders Limpar Soccer screenshot in C64 at rawgamer.de
 Gazza's Superstar Soccer at Edward Grabowski's

1989 video games
Association football video games
Video game sequels
Amiga games
Amstrad CPC games
Atari ST games
ZX Spectrum games
Commodore 64 games
Video games developed in the United Kingdom
Video games based on real people
Cultural depictions of association football players
Cultural depictions of British men
Empire Interactive games